Glover Wilkins was a long-time administrator of the Tennessee-Tombigbee Waterway Development Authority.

External links
Tennessee-Tombigbee Waterway Development Authority

Tennessee–Tombigbee Waterway